The French Ice Hockey Federation is the governing body of ice hockey in France, as recognized by the International Ice Hockey Federation (IIHF). It was founded in 2006 after separation with the Fédération française des sports de glace (English: French Ice Sports Federation).
For the first ten years, the federation had its offices in Issy-les-Moulineaux, Hauts-de-Seine. In 2016, it moved to a new national training center in Cergy, Val-d'Oise. It manages both the amateur and professional games in France, as well as the national teams on junior and senior levels. France is a founding member of the IIHF.

Luc Tardif served as the inaugural president of the federation from its inception in 2006 to 2021. Upon his election as president of the IIHF, he was succeeded by Pierre-Yves Gerbeau.

See also
 France national ice hockey team
 France women's national ice hockey team
 France women's ice hockey league
 Ligue Magnus
 Coupe de France (ice hockey)
 Coupe de la Ligue (ice hockey)
 Match des Champions

References

External links
 Official website

Ice hockey in France
France
France
Sports organizations established in 2006
Ice hockey